Hugh V (died 8 October 1060), called the Fair or the Pious, was the fifth Lord of Lusignan and Lord of Couhé. He succeeded his father, Hugh IV, sometime around 1026.

Marriage and children
Hugh married Almodis (990 or c. 1020 – murdered October 16, 1071), daughter of Bernard I, Count of La Marche, through which future counts would claim La Marche. He then repudiated her on the basis of consanguinity and she married Pons of Toulouse.

Hugh and Almodis had: 
Hugh VI of Lusignan
Jordan de Lusignan
Mélisende de Lusignan (b. bef. 1055), married before 1074 to Simon I "l'Archevêque", Vidame de Parthenay.

Conflict
When Duke William VIII of Aquitaine, Hugh's suzerain, was at war with William IV of Toulouse, Almodis persuaded Hugh to join her son's side. The duke besieged Lusignan and when Hugh tried to sortie for provisions, he was slain at the gate. He was succeeded by his eldest son, also named Hugh.

Sources

1060 deaths
House of Lusignan
11th-century French people
Year of birth unknown